Short track speed skating at the 2020 Winter Youth Olympics took place at the CIG de Malley in Lausanne, Switzerland from 18 to 22 January 2020.

Medal summary

Medal table

Events

Qualification
64 skaters (32 per gender) will qualify to compete. The top four countries ranked in the women's 500 metres and men's 1000 metres events at the 2019 World Junior Short Track Speed Skating Championships qualified two athletes for the respective gender. The rest of the spots were awarded one per NOC until the total quota was complete. The host nation has the right to enter one athlete in each event if not qualified.

Switzerland did not qualify a male skater. However, as host nation is entitled to enter one male athlete. If the country chooses to do so, it would replace Bulgaria in the competition. Switzerland did decide to use its men's quota.
Australia, Slovenia and Sweden declined girls' quotas. These spots were not reallocated.
Luxembourg, Serbia and Slovenia did not use boys' quotas. These were reallocated to Bulgaria, Singapore and Croatia

Summary
A total of 32 countries qualified skaters.

References

External links
Results Book – Short Track Speed Skating

 
Youth Olympics
2020
2020 Winter Youth Olympics events